Camilla Hattersley (born 24 February 1995) is a British swimmer. She competed in the women's 4 × 200 metre freestyle relay and 800 metre freestyle events at the 2016 Summer Olympics.

Personal life
Hattersley was born on 24 February 1995 in Edinburgh, Scotland. She attended Perth Academy in Perth, Scotland before graduating with a degree in aeronautical engineering from the University of Glasgow.

Career
Hattersley competed for Scotland at the 2014 Commonwealth Games. She finished 7th in the 800m freestyle final. At the 2015 British Swimming Championships, she won a bronze medal in the 800m freestyle event. The following year she improved on this with a silver medal in the same event. She also finished joint 7th in the 400 metre freestyle final at the 2016 European Aquatics Championships. In April 2016, Hattersley was selected to be part of the British swimming team at the 2016 Summer Olympics.

References

External links
 

1995 births
Living people
Scottish female swimmers
British female swimmers
Olympic swimmers of Great Britain
Swimmers at the 2016 Summer Olympics
Swimmers at the 2014 Commonwealth Games
Swimmers at the 2018 Commonwealth Games
Commonwealth Games competitors for Scotland
Sportspeople from Edinburgh
People educated at Perth Academy